Rowing was part of the 2007 All-Africa Games competition schedule.

Results

Men

Women

References 
Sports123

Rowing at the African Games
2007 All-Africa Games
2007 in rowing
Rowing competitions in Algeria